Aashari Crosswell (born August 8, 2000) is an American football safety who is currently a free agent. He played college football for Arizona State.

Early life and high school
Crosswell was born and raised in Los Angeles, California, he attended the Long Beach Polytechnic High School at Long Beach, California where he committed to football from there, before choosing to commit to Arizona State, he received offers from other colleges such as USC, Nebraska and Auburn. In December 2020 he declared for the 2021 NFL Draft.

Professional career

Seattle Seahawks
Crosswell signed with the Seattle Seahawks as an undrafted free agent on May 13, 2021. He was released during roster cuts on August 31, 2021.

New Orleans Breakers
On March 10, 2022, Crosswell was drafted by the New Orleans Breakers of the United States Football League in the 2022 USFL Supplemental Draft. He was transferred to the team's practice squad before the start of the regular season on April 16, 2022, and remained on the inactive roster on April 22. He was transferred to the active roster on April 30. He became a free agent when his contract expired on December 31, 2022.

References

External links
 Arizona Sun Devils bio

Living people
American football safeties
Arizona State Sun Devils football players
Players of American football from Arizona
Seattle Seahawks players
Players of American football from Los Angeles
2000 births
New Orleans Breakers (2022) players